Toshifumi (Toshi) Yokota is a medical scientist and professor of medical genetics at the University of Alberta, where he also holds the titles of the Friends of Garrett Cumming Research & Muscular Dystrophy Canada Endowed Research Chair and the Henri M. Toupin Chair in Neurological Science. He is best known for his studies of antisense oligonucleotide-based therapeutics for muscular dystrophy that led to the development of an FDA-approved drug viltolarsen. His research interests include precision medicine for muscular dystrophy and genetic diseases. He has co-edited two books both published in the Methods in Molecular Biology series from Humana Press, Springer-Nature, and has published more than 100 refereed papers and patents.  He is a member of the editorial boards for the International Journal of Molecular Sciences, Genes, Frontiers in Genome Editing, Frontiers in Physiology, and Nucleic Acid Therapeutics, a member of the Medical and Scientific Advisory Committee of Muscular Dystrophy Canada, and a co-founder of the Canadian Neuromuscular Network (CAN-NMD).

Biography 
Yokota was born in Morioka, a city in Iwate Prefecture, and raised in multiple cities including Tsu, Mie and Nerima, Tokyo, in Japan. He was initially interested in astrophysics; however, his interests changed after taking a genetics class and hearing about gene therapy research for muscular dystrophy at the University of Tokyo. After receiving research training at the University of Tokyo and the National Center of Neurology and Psychiatry, he received his Ph.D. in Biological Science, where he studied the mechanisms underlying skeletal muscle regeneration. He completed his post-doctoral training at Imperial College London, Hammersmith Hospital Campus as a Research Fellow of the Japan Society for the Promotion of Science.  He was a research associate at the Children's National Medical Center before joining the University of Alberta. Currently, he is a tenured professor at the University of Alberta Faculty of Medicine and Dentistry, serving as the Friends of Garrett Cumming Research & Muscular Dystrophy Canada Endowed Research Chair and the Henri M. Toupin Chair in Neurological Science since 2011.

Major contributions 
Yokota's research focuses on precision health and personalized genetic medicine using single strands of artificial DNA/RNA-like molecules called antisense oligonucleotides for neuromuscular diseases. His study demonstrated the therapeutic potential of antisense oligonucleotides for exon skipping, which can be designed to frame-disrupting exons and restore the reading frame and function of a mutated gene by modulating pre-mRNA splicing, leading to the improvement of skeletal muscle function accompanied by dystrophin restoration for the first time in a severe animal model of Duchenne muscular dystrophy (DMD). Based on his study, viltolarsen, a phosphorodiamidate morpholino oligomer antisense oligonucleotide, was developed for the treatment of DMD in collaboration with a Japanese pharmaceutical company Nippon Shinyaku (also known as NS Pharma). Viltolarsen was later approved by the Pharmaceuticals and Medical Devices Agency in Japan and by the FDA in the United States in March and August 2020, respectively, after clinical trials conducted in Japan, Canada, and the United States. His team further developed a potential treatment for nearly half of DMD patients using multiple antisense oligonucleotides and demonstrated therapeutic effects in a dystrophic mouse model. Supported by the Heart and Stroke Foundation of Canada, his team developed a cocktail of peptide-conjugated morpholinos (PPMOs) and restored expression of dystrophin in the myocardium and Purkinje fibers in the heart muscle of dystrophic animal models. In 2021, his team developed eSkip-Finder, a machine learning-mediated free online application with a database of antisense oligonucleotides to facilitate the design of antisense oligonucleotides that can be used for exon skipping targeted for various genes and exons.

Supported by the Canadian Institutes of Health Research and Muscular Dystrophy Canada, his team is also developing antisense oligonucleotide-mediated therapy for facioscapulohumeral muscular dystrophy using lipid nanoparticles in collaboration with Pieter Cullis. In 2020, he identified antisense oligonucleotides called gapmers that knock down the expression of a toxic gene called DUX4 in cell and mouse models for the treatment of facioscapulohumeral muscular dystrophy.

In 2022, his team identified gapmers that selectively knocked down most of the mutated mRNA for the treatment of fibrodysplasia ossificans progressiva. With support from CIHR and muscular dystrophy Canada, the team also identified novel peptide-conjugated morpholinos called DG9-PMOs that effectively improved mouse models of DMD and spinal muscular atrophy.

Honors 
 Research Fellow of the Japan Society for the Promotion of Science (2003-2005)
 National Institutes of Health Ruth L. Kirschstein National Research Service Award (2010)
 The Friends of Garrett Cumming Research & Muscular Dystrophy Canada Endowed Research Chair (2011-)
 The Henri M. Toupin Chair in Neurological Science (2011-)
 Canadian Institutes of Health Research China-Canada Joint Health Research Initiative Award (2013)
 Scientific Achievement and Innovation Award, BioAlberta (2022)

Selected publications 
 Yokota T, Lu QL, Partridge T, Kobayashi M, Nakamura A, Takeda S, Hoffman E. Efficacy of morpholino systemic exon-skipping in Duchenne dystrophy dogs. Ann. Neurol., 2009, 65:667-76.
 Echigoya Y, Lim K, Trieu N, Bao B, Miskew B, Vila MC, Novak JS, Hara Y, Lee J, Touznik A, Mamchaoui K, Aoki Y, Takeda S, Nagaraju K, Mouly V, Maruyama R, Duddy W, Yokota T. Quantitative antisense screening and optimization for exon 51 skipping in Duchenne muscular dystrophy. Mol Ther. 2017, 25(11): 2561-2572.
 Echigoya Y, Nakamura A, Aoki Y, Nagata T, Kuraoka M, Urasawa N, Panesar D, Iversen P, Kole R, Maruyama R, Partridge T, Takeda S, Yokota T. Effects of systemic multi-exon skipping with peptide-conjugated morpholinos in the heart of a dog model of Duchenne muscular dystrophy. Proc. Natl. Acad. Sci. U S A., 2017, 114 (16), 4213-4218.
 Lim K, Echigoya Y, Nagata T, Kuraoka M, Kobayashi M, Aoki Y, Partridge T, Maruyama R, Takeda S, Yokota T. Efficacy of multi-exon skipping treatment in Duchenne muscular dystrophy dog model neonates. Mol. Ther. 2019, 27(1): 76-86.
 Echigoya Y, Lim K, Melo D, Bao B, Trieu N, Mizobe Y, Maruyama R, Mamchaoui K, Tanihata J, Aoki Y, Takeda S, Mouly V, Duddy W, Yokota T. Exons 45-55 skipping using mutation-tailored cocktails of antisense morpholinos in the DMD gene. Mol. Ther. 2019, 27(11): 2005-17.
 Lim K, Maruyama R, Echigoya Y, Nguyen Q, Khawaja H, Chandra S, Jones T, Jones P, Chen Y, Yokota T. Inhibition of DUX4 expression with antisense LNA gapmers as a therapy for facioscapulohumeral muscular dystrophy. Proc. Natl. Acad. Sci. U S A. 2020, 117 (28), 16509-16515.
 Lim K, Bittel A, Maruyama R, Echigoya Y, Nguyen Q, Huang Y, Dzierlega, Zhang A, Chen Y, Yokota T. DUX4 transcript knockdown with antisense 2’-O-methoxyethyl gapmers for the treatment of facioscapulohumeral muscular dystrophy. Mol. Ther. 2021, 29(2): 848-58.
 Chiba S, Lim K, Sheri N, Anwar S, Erkut E, Shah A, Aslesh T, Woo S, Sheikh O, Maruyama R, Takano H, Kunitake K, Duddy W, Okuno Y, Aoki Y, Yokota T. eSkip-Finder: a machine learning-based web application and database to identify the optimal sequences of antisense oligonucleotides for exon skipping. Nucleic Acids Res. 2021, 49(W1):W193-W198.
 Lim K, Woo S, Melo D, Huang Y, Dzierlega K, Shah MNA, Aslesh, Roshmi RR, Echigoya Y, Maruyama R, Moulton HM, Yokota T. Development of DG9 peptide-conjugated single- and multi-exon skipping therapies for the treatment of Duchenne muscular dystrophy. Proc. Natl. Acad. Sci. U S A. 2022, 119 (9) e2112546119.

References

External links
 

Japanese medical researchers
Living people
Year of birth missing (living people)
University of Tokyo alumni
Academic staff of the University of Alberta
People from Morioka, Iwate
21st-century Japanese scientists
Japanese expatriates in the United Kingdom
People from Nerima
People from Tsu, Mie
Japanese geneticists
Japanese expatriates in Canada